Ferdinand William Baehr (1822–1892) was a Republican politician from California. He served as California State Treasurer in 1871–1875.

Businessman 
In 1869, the San Francisco Directory listed Ferdinand Baehr as a manufacturing jeweler with the firm Baehr William & Co.

Family man
Ferdinand Baehr married Augusta Catharine Scroder in 1857. They had a son William Baehr Jr., who became a partner in the firm A. Gerberding & Co.

State office-holder  
Ferdinand Baehr became California State Treasurer after winning elections on Republican ticket on September 6, 1871, and served as state treasurer until September 7, 1875, when he lost after running as an independent candidate.

References 

State treasurers of California
1822 births
1892 deaths
California Republicans
19th-century American politicians